The Johnson Street Historic District, in Big Horn, Wyoming, is a  historic district which was listed on the National Register of Historic Places in 1984.  The listing included five contributing buildings.

Big Horn Johnson Street Historic District
Historic function: Social; Government; Commerce/trade
Historic subfunction: Department Store; Clubhouse; Post Office; Restaurant
Criteria: event, event, architecture/engineering, architecture/engineering

References

Historic districts on the National Register of Historic Places in Wyoming
National Register of Historic Places in Sheridan County, Wyoming